Keo Sokpheng (born on 3 March 1992) is a Cambodian footballer. He was born in Kratié in Cambodia. He plays for Visakha in the Cambodian C-League and the Cambodia national football team. He plays mainly as a forward (either wide or central) but also can deploy as a winger. He is Keo Sokngon's younger brother who is a retired footballer.

Club career
In June 2015 both Sokpheng and his brother Sokngon were signed by Phnom Penh Crown to play in the 2015 Cambodian League. Ironically Phnom Penh Crown's first game of the season was against the Keo brothers' former team, Boeung Ket Angkor.

Sokpheng signed for Malaysia's PKNP F.C. for one season, for the 2018 Malaysia Super League. On his league debut for the club on 1 February 2018, Sokpheng became the first Cambodian to play in the Malaysian league, and the first Cambodian to score in the league, when his goal helps his team defeat Negeri Sembilan F.A. 1-0. He was released by PKNP in May 2018, but despite rumors he rejoined Phnom Penh Crown, Sokpheng joined another C-League team, Visakha FC in June 2018.

International career
Sokpheng was a member of Cambodia's squad at the 2015 Southeast Asian Games football tournament, scoring three goals in four games. Soon after he was called up to the senior side to take part in 2018 World Cup qualification, where he started in a 1-0 home defeat to Afghanistan. He scored his first international goal in a friendly match against Bhutan.

Sokpheng scored 4 goals at the 2019 Southeast Asian Games football tournament in the Philippines. He was one of the most important players contributed to the historic achievement of Cambodian football (4th place).

Personal life
He was born from a Chinese-Vietnamese family, lived in Vietnam until 14 years old and was a big fan of the Vietnamese footballer Lê Công Vinh.

International goals
As of match played 14 June 2022. Cambodia score listed first, score column indicates score after each Sokpheng goal.

Honours

Club
Boeung Ket Rubber Field
 C-League: 2012
Phnom Penh Crown
 C-League: 2015

References

1992 births
Living people
Cambodian footballers
Cambodian expatriate footballers
Cambodia international footballers
Cambodian sportspeople of Chinese descent
Cambodian people of Vietnamese descent
Sportspeople of Vietnamese descent
People from Kratié province
Boeung Ket Rubber Field players
Association football forwards
Phnom Penh Crown FC players
Competitors at the 2019 Southeast Asian Games
Southeast Asian Games competitors for Cambodia
Visakha FC players
Cambodian Premier League players